Subhash Chandra (21 June 1933 – 13 June 2016), better known by his pen name, Mudrarakshas the eminent writer was a Hindi playwright, journalist,  activist, thinker and cultural personality  and critic from Lucknow, India. He was born in Lucknow on 21 June 1933 and died in the city on 13 June 2016, after illnesses due to old age.

Mudrarakshas received his M.A. degree in Hindi from Lucknow University and worked in Kolkata based Gyanodaya Magazine in 1950s. He joined All India Radio, Delhi as a script editor in 1962 and worked there as an instructor till 1976.

Mudrarakshas has also been a doyen of Awadhi Folk Art Forms including Nautanki, Bhand, Swang Sapera, and Bharthari etc. A recipient of President of India's Sangeet Natak Academy and several other awards authored more than 60 books and directed several plays, Mudrarakshas has been known for his writings on Dalits and minorities. He also worked in All India Radio and has been a leader in drama writing and direction. He was also well known as a director, and has about thirty stage productions to his credit.

Known for his uncompromising principles, and straightforward writing style, he quit work in 1976 and continued as a writer till his death.

He received many awards including  
Awards –  Sahitya Bhushan, Kaifi Azmi Award, Sarvoday Sahitya Award, Sangeet Natak Academy Ratna Sadasyata Award, Rashtriya Sangeet Natak Akademi Award. 
Titles Conferred on him – Dalit Ratna, Shudracharya, Lok Natya Shiromani

Bibliography 
PLAYS :
Yours Faithfully, Daku, Ala Afsar, Tendua, Santola, Marjeeva, Tilchatta, Gufayein, Ginipig, Badbakht Badshah

ENGLISH LITERATURE : 
The Hunted, Re-reading Jesus

NOVELS :
Madelin, Makbara, Achla ek manahsthiti, Shanti Bhang, Bhagoda, Hum Sab Mansaram, Narkiya, Dandvidhan, Ardhvrat, Hastakshep, Shok Samvad, Shabd Dansh, Mera Naam Tera Naam, Gyarah Sapno Ka desh.

STORY BOOKS :
Pratihinsa Tatha Anya Kahaniyan, Nihatthe, 21 Shreshth Kahaniyan, 10 Pratinidhi Kahaniyan, Meri Kahaniyan, Mudrarakshas Sankalit Kahaniyan, Shreshth Dalit Kahaniyan.

BOOKS ON SATIRE:
Mathuradas Ki Dairy, Rakshas Uchav, Prapanchtantra, Suno Bhai Sadho, Ek Aur Prapanchtantra.

OTHER BOOKS :
Dharmgranthon Ka Punarpaath, Mudrarakshas Srajan Evam Sandarbh, Bhartiya Arthtantra Nishane Pe, Bahas Chaurahe Pe, Beech Bahas Main, Alochana Aur Rachna Ki Uljhane, Kalateet, Bhagat Singh Hone Ka Matlab, Nemichandra Jain, Dharm Banam Andhvishwas, Bhartiya Sanskriti Aur Vampanth, Sahitya Samiksha – Paribhashayein Aur Samasyayein, Bhartiya Sanskriti Ke Chitra, Nitshe, Gospello Ka Punarpaath.

CHILDREN’S BOOKS :
Chitipuram Ke Bhure Lal, Sarla Billu Aur Jala.

 He wrote plays, children's stories, critiques, novels, short stories, analysis and worked as an editor for Hindi magazine Anuvaarta.

References 

Hindi-language writers
1933 births
2016 deaths
Writers from Lucknow
Hindi dramatists and playwrights
20th-century Indian dramatists and playwrights
Dramatists and playwrights from Uttar Pradesh
Recipients of the Sangeet Natak Akademi Award